National Prize of Plastic Arts of Venezuela is an annual award given to various artists from that country, specifically the field of drawing, printmaking and drawing pictorial. It is one of the National Culture Awards.

The reward is delivered continuously since 1947. In 1952 awarding paused for about 19 years, resumed in 1971. The granting is made on an annual basis since its first edition until 2001, when it turned biennial. An exception to this rule was 2003, when it waited three years to give the next award, and then return to biennial delivery.

List of Winners

References

External links 

 Facebook: Galería de Arte Venezolano en la Web

Videos 
 Youtube: José Antonio Dávila – Premio Nacional de Cultura 2010 2012
 Youtube:Juan Calzadilla (Premio Nacional de Cultura, mención Artes Plásticas, 1

Venezuelan art
Venezuela-related lists
Venezuelan awards